Melrose is an unincorporated community in Natchitoches Parish, Louisiana, United States, including the Melrose Plantation and surrounding area, on Louisiana Highway 119. In addition to the historic plantation, the Cane River Creole National Historical Park and Heritage Area encompass the  Melrose area.

Melrose is part of the Natchitoches Micropolitan Statistical Area.

References

External links
 Melrose area attractions on deltablues.net
 Cane River Creole National Park
 

Unincorporated communities in Natchitoches Parish, Louisiana
Unincorporated communities in Louisiana
Populated places in Ark-La-Tex